Thalassoplanes is a genus of sea snails, marine gastropod mollusks in the family Buccinidae, the true whelks.

Species
Species within the genus Thalassoplanes include:
 Thalassoplanes amabilis (Thiele, 1912)
 Thalassoplanes modesta (Martens, 1885)
 Thalassoplanes moerchi (Dall, 1908)

References

Buccinidae